Chrysus (Khrysos; meaning "gold") in Greek mythology is a minor god and the personification of gold.

Mythology 
Chrysus is mentioned only once in Greek literature by Pindar:

In his Isthmian Odes, Pindar also wrote:

Mother of the Sun, Theia of many names, for your sake men honor gold as more powerful than anything else,

Furthermore, a scholium on those lines wrote , denoting a special connection of Theia, the goddess of sight and brilliance, with gold as the mother of Helios the Sun.

See also 
 List of Greek mythological figures
 Plutus

References 

Greek gods
Abundance gods
Fortune gods
Children of Zeus
Personifications in Greek mythology
Children of Helios